Theodul Pass, elevation , (German: Theodulpass, Italian: Colle del Teodulo, French: Col de Saint-Théodule, Walser German: Theoduljoch) is a high mountain pass across the eastern Pennine Alps, connecting Zermatt in the Swiss canton of Valais and Breuil-Cervinia in the Italian region of Aosta Valley. Theodul Pass is the lowest and the easiest pass between the valleys of Zermatt and Valtournanche.

The pass lies between the Matterhorn on the west and the Breithorn on the east and is overlooked by the Theodulhorn and Testa Grigia. The Rifugio del Teodulo (hut) is located just above the pass. The east side of the pass is covered by large glaciers part of the Theodul Glacier system and is part of a year-round ski area. On the Italian side, the pass can be reached from Breuil-Cervinia by a dead-end trail. On the Swiss side, trails go up from Trockener Steg and Gandegg Hut.

Traverse by bicycle
In 1965, Percy Stallard (aged 55) rode his bicycle solo over the Theodul Pass. The Rough Stuff Fellowship, an organisation for enthusiasts of cross-country cycling, acknowledged that it was probably the first time a cyclist had done it. Stallard made it in less than 15 hours, sometimes through deep snow.

See also
 List of mountain passes

References

External links 

Rifugio Teodulo (Italian)

Mountain passes of Valais
Mountain passes of Aosta Valley
Mountain passes of the Alps
Italy–Switzerland border crossings